The 1992 United States presidential election in South Carolina took place on November 3, 1992, as part of the 1992 United States presidential election. Voters chose 8 representatives, or electors to the Electoral College, who voted for president and vice president.

South Carolina was won by incumbent President George H. W. Bush (R-Texas) with 48.02% of the popular vote over Governor Bill Clinton (D-Arkansas) with 39.88%. Businessman Ross Perot (I-Texas) finished in third, with 11.55% of the popular vote. Clinton ultimately won the national vote, defeating both incumbent President Bush and Perot.

This election marked the completion of South Carolina's transformation from one of the strongest Democratic states in the country to a reliably Republican one. South Carolina had voted for the Democratic nominee in every election from 1880 (the first election after Reconstruction) through 1944, always by wide margins and usually giving the Democrat over 90% of the vote. After it voted for Strom Thurmond in 1948, it returned to the Democratic fold to vote for Adlai Stevenson twice and for Kennedy in 1960, albeit narrowly. 

After Barry Goldwater carried the state in 1964, however, it lost its standing as a safe Democratic state. As a socially conservative and religious Southern state, South Carolina generally trended more Republican in the 1970s and 1980s, as the center of the Democratic Party moved more into socially liberal and secular New England. Native Southerner Jimmy Carter powerfully carried the state in 1976 and only narrowly lost it in 1980, but after it spurned Arkansan Bill Clinton for George H. W. Bush in 1992, it would be counted as a safe red state, along with fellow Deep South states Mississippi and Alabama.

At the time of the election, Clinton was only the fifth Democrat to win without carrying South Carolina, after Andrew Jackson, Martin van Buren, Harry S. Truman, and Lyndon B. Johnson. , this is the last election in which Edgefield County voted for a Democratic presidential candidate.
 This is the first election in which any South Carolina county cast more than one hundred thousand votes, namely Greenville and Richland.

With 48.02% of the popular vote, South Carolina would prove to be Bush's second strongest state in the 1992 election after Mississippi.

Results

Results by county

Results by congressional district

References

South Carolina
1992
1992 South Carolina elections